Grant Margeman (born 3 June 1998) is a South African professional soccer player who plays as a central midfielder for SuperSport United on loan from Mamelodi Sundowns in the Premier Soccer League.

Club career
Born in Cape Town, Grant Margeman made his senior professional debut in the 2016/2017 season at the age of 18 years under Head Coach Stanley Menzo.

International career
Grant Margeman competed at the 2017 Africa U-20 Cup of Nations held in Zambia and helped his national team qualify for the 2017 FIFA U-20 World Cup.

Later that Summer in 2017, Grant Margeman made his debut at the 2017 FIFA U-20 World Cup against Japan. Grant Margeman scored his first goal in the World Cup and it would end being the only goal scored for South Africa in the entire tournament. During the 2017 FIFA U20 World Cup competition, back home in Cape Town, Grant Margeman was awarded the 2017 Rookie of the Year Award by his respective club Ajax Cape Town.

Career statistics

International goals
Scores and results list South Africa's goal tally first.

References

1998 births
Living people
South African soccer players
Cape Coloureds
Association football midfielders
Sportspeople from Cape Town
Cape Town Spurs F.C. players
Mamelodi Sundowns F.C. players
Moroka Swallows F.C. players
SuperSport United F.C. players
South African Premier Division players
South Africa international soccer players
2019 Africa U-23 Cup of Nations players